Paul Biondi, from Long Island, New York, United States, is a composer for television and guitar teacher. He has composed background music for many popular television shows, including:MTV Cribs, CBS Sports and various advertising spots (AT&T; Pepsi-Complex).

Composer

Television
MTV Cribs
CBS Sports
NFL Today (on CBS)
2008 Olympic Games (Team United States)
Room Raiders (MTV)
Human Giant (MTV)
Pepsi-Complex fashion (advertising spots)
MTV: Tr3s
Masters Tournament (CBS Sports)
World Series of Video Games (CBS Sports)
MTV’s Living the Dream – reality television show
Cablevision's Video On Demand Services

Industrial and Radio
Satellite, Internet, College and Community radio
Commercial and industrial training videos, DVDs and multimedia

Hurricane Jar - acoustic guitar music for television
Paul Biondi is also the writer and main performer behind the all acoustic Americana-Rock project Hurricane Jar.  The Hurricane Jar project was the second artist release form the independent label Bang On Records. It was his first self-produced CD and was released in 2001.

External links
 Official Website 
 Official Myspace Page

References
Paul Biondi's official website

Living people
American male composers
21st-century American composers
People from Long Island
21st-century American male musicians
Year of birth missing (living people)